Lichenostigma is a genus of fungi. It includes several species which are lichenicolous (i.e. parasitic on lichens).

Lichenostigma is in the family Phaeococcomycetaceae.

Species
Lichenostigma alpinum 
Lichenostigma amplum 
Lichenostigma anatolicum 
Lichenostigma bolacinae 
Lichenostigma canariense 
Lichenostigma chlaroterae 
Lichenostigma cosmopolites 
Lichenostigma dimelaenae 
Lichenostigma diploiciae 
Lichenostigma elongatum 
Lichenostigma epipolinum 
Lichenostigma epiporpidiae 
Lichenostigma epirupestre 
Lichenostigma episulphurellum 
Lichenostigma fellhanerae 
Lichenostigma gracile 
Lichenostigma heterodermiae 
Lichenostigma iranicum  – Iran
Lichenostigma lecanorae 
Lichenostigma maureri 
Lichenostigma radicans 
Lichenostigma rouxii 
Lichenostigma rupicolae 
Lichenostigma saxicola  – California
Lichenostigma subradians 
Lichenostigma supertegentis 
Lichenostigma svandae 
Lichenostigma triseptatum 
Lichenostigma verrucosum  – Iran

References

Arthoniomycetes
Ascomycota genera
Lichenicolous fungi
Taxa named by Josef Hafellner
Taxa described in 1983